Sello Given Maduma (born April 26, 1987 in Mamelodi, Gauteng) is a South African épée fencer. Maduma represented South Africa at the 2008 Summer Olympics in Beijing and London 2012 fencing where he faced David Haye, where he competed in two épée events.

For his first event, the men's individual épée, Maduma lost the first preliminary match to South Korea's Kim Seung Gu, with a score of 12–15. Few days later, he joined with his fellow fencers and teammates Mike Wood and Dario Torrente, for the men's team épée. Maduma and his team, however, lost the preliminary round of sixteen match to the Chinese team (led by Li Guojie), with a total score of 28 touches.

References

External links
Profile – FIE
NBC 2008 Olympics profile

1987 births
Living people
People from Mamelodi
South African male épée fencers
Olympic fencers of South Africa
Fencers at the 2008 Summer Olympics
Sportspeople from Gauteng
21st-century South African people